The Groucho Club is a private members' club formed in 1985 located on Dean Street in London's Soho. Its members are mostly drawn from the publishing, media, entertainment and arts industries.

The club has rooms on several floors, including three bars, two restaurants, an enclosed terrace and 20 bedrooms available for members or their guests, a snooker room, and four event rooms available for hire.

History
The club opened 5 May 1985. Its name was in reference to Groucho Marx's telegram saying he did not want to be a member of any club that would have him.

The club was owned from 2006 to 2015 by Graphite Capital, who sold it to a group of investors led by Isfield Investments and Alcuin Capital Partners.

In 2022, the Groucho Club was purchased through Manuela and Iwan Wirth's Art Farm, which owns a group of boutique hotels and restaurants, for £40 million ($48.9 million).

Members

Anyone may apply for membership, but applications are favoured from individuals working in the creative side of media and the arts and who are proposed by two existing members.

Well-known members of the club include Lily Allen, Melvyn Bragg, Stephen Fry, Noel Gallagher, Luke Pasqualino and Rachel Weisz.

Art
The club has a large collection of contemporary art curated by Nicki Carter, a graduate of Goldsmiths' during the YBA period, erstwhile waitress and now longest serving employee of the club. The Groucho Club Collection includes works by: Gavin Turk, Marc Quinn, Ian Davenport, Gary Hume, Alison Watt, Damien Hirst, Josef O'Connor, Sir Peter Blake, Mat Collishaw, Hayden Kays, Conrad Shawcross, Polly Morgan, Jim Lambie and Stella Vine and Carl Hopgood.

The Groucho Club Maverick Award
Launched in 2010 as 'the antidote to other awards', The Groucho Award celebrates people who have broken the mould in their own particular field, by challenging and making a significant contribution to culture and the Arts in the previous 12 months, either in the UK or internationally. Nominations for the award are made by Groucho Club members. The winner of the award receives £10,000 in prize money, lifetime membership and a sculpture. The announcement of the winner is made at an awards ceremony held at the club.

Previous winners include:
The Bush Theatre (2013 Winner), Tamara Rojo, Jeremy Deller, Jack Monroe, Haifaa Al-Mansour, Matilda Tristram.
Danny Boyle (2012 Winner), Michael Fassbender, Pussy Riot, Grayson Perry, Noel Fielding, Deborah Curtis.
Nick Davies (2011 Winner), Molly Crabapple, Idris Elba, Hilary Lloyd, Caitlin Moran, Tom Watson.
Nell Gifford (2010 Winner), Javier De Frutos, Monte Hellman, Henry Hudson, Simon Singh, Tilda Swinton.

The Gang Show
The Groucho Club produces The Gang Show held every year at the club. Previous performers have included Chrissie Hynde, UB40, Heaven 17, Annie Lennox, Collette Cooper, Babyshambles, Rufus Hound, Michael McIntyre, Miles Kane, Professor Green, David Walliams, Texas, Sophie Ellis-Bextor, Alphabeat, The Feeling, Eliza Doolittle, Nigel Kennedy, Kaiser Chiefs, David Arnold, David McAlmont, The Hoosiers, Armstrong & Miller, Howard Marks, Jessica Hynes, The Boy With Tape on His Face, Leigh Francis, and Rich Hall.

Pop ups

Ibiza
In 2012, the Groucho Club hosted a pop up in Ibiza from 16 to 28 August 2012 at Sa Talaia open to members and non-members. The pop up was to raise money for the Teenage Cancer Trust.

From 18 to 22 August 2013, the Groucho Club hosted another Ibiza pop up at restored finca, Pikes Hotel, in the North of Ibiza, in San Juan.

Hay Festival
Hay-on-Wye on the Welsh border is known as the 'town of books' and every year hosts the Hay Festival. The Groucho Club was invited to set up a temporary restaurant and bar in the Medieval Hay Castle in the centre of town from 23 May to 2 June 2013. In 2014 the club popped up again at the festival from 23 May to 1 June 2014.

Further reading

References

External links
Official website
Evening Standard Article

Nightclubs in London
Arts in London
Buildings and structures in the City of Westminster
Soho, London
Marx Brothers
Private members' clubs